The siege of Toulouse was a Frankish siege of the Aquitanian fortified town of Toulouse in the winter of 767 during the Aquitanian War. The Frankish army under King Pepin the Short conquered the town and accepted the surrender of nearby Albi and Gevaudan.

Prelude
In early 767 King Pepin the Short of Francia army marched through Aquitaine into Narbonne and moved on to besiege Toulouse. Bourges, conquered in 762 by Pepin, was the most important base for the campaign.

Siege
Toulouse was conquered and the nearby towns of Albi and Gevaudan submitted to Pepin without a fight.

Aftermath
Most and possibly all of the fortified places in Aquitaine were in Frankish hands by the end of 767. Pepin returned home and spent Easter at Vienne. He continued the war against Aquitaine in August 767. In the next year, King Pepin defeated the last few allies of Waiofar, Duke of Aquitaine (between 745-768), and then captured him and most of his family and executed them in public.

References

Bibliography
 
 
 

Toulouse 767
Toulouse
767
8th century in Francia